Romain Cabon (born 24 June 1987 in Brest) is a French professional football player, who currently plays for US Concarneau.

Career
He played on the professional level in Ligue 2 for Stade Brestois 29.

Notes

1987 births
Living people
French footballers
Quimper Kerfeunteun F.C. players
Ligue 2 players
Stade Brestois 29 players
US Avranches players
US Concarneau players
Association football defenders
Sportspeople from Brest, France
Footballers from Brittany